Robert Slater (1943–2014) was an American author and journalist.

Robert Slater may also refer to:
Robert Slater (bowls), English lawn bowls player
Rob Slater (1960–1995), American mountaineer
Robbie Slater (born 1964), English-born Australian footballer and sports commentator
Bert Slater (1936–2006), Scottish footballer 
Robert Kelly Slater (born 1972), American professional surfer

See also
Bob Slater (1934–1994), Australian rules footballer
Robert Salter (disambiguation)